Group B of the 2010 Fed Cup Europe/Africa Zone Group III was one of two pools in the Europe/Africa Zone Group III of the 2010 Fed Cup. Three teams competed in a round robin competition, with the top two teams and the bottom team proceeding to their respective sections of the play-offs: the top teams played for advancement to the Group II.

Morocco vs. Algeria

Ireland vs. Malta

Morocco vs. Ireland

Malta vs. Algeria

Morocco vs. Malta

Ireland vs. Algeria

See also
Fed Cup structure

References

External links
 Fed Cup website

2010 Fed Cup Europe/Africa Zone